WCPX-LD, virtual channel 48 (UHF digital channel 25), is a low-power television station licensed to Columbus, Ohio, United States. The station is owned by SagamoreHill Broadcasting. WCPX-LD's transmitter is located on East Naghten Street in downtown Columbus. Programming is currently unknown.

History
WCPX ceased operations on channel 48 due to the impending move of full-power WSYX to broadcast its digital signal on channel 48. Because low-power television is a "secondary" service, a full-power station can displace a low-power station to improve the full-power station's coverage. ABC affiliate WSYX (channel 6) received permission in 2009 to move its digital broadcast from VHF channel 13 to channel 48 so as to better replicate WSYX's original analog full-power coverage.

Prior to the station joining Azteca América in January 2008, the station was a translator of WSFJ-TV, at that time an Ion Television affiliate; even though network owner Ion Media Networks did not own WSFJ, it did own WCPX-LP. Until 1995, the station (as W62BE, though it branded as "WCLS-TV") was an independent station operating on analog channel 62, with studios located in the Greater Columbus Convention Center until 1994, when studios and office was moved to nearby Grandview Heights.

Between March and June 2010, WCPX broadcast Azteca América programming on WCSN-LD1. In June 2010, Columbus Hispanic Media, LLC and Columbus Television, LLC (owners of WCSN-LD) ended their relationship as Columbus Hispanic Media, LLC's owners struggled to determine their company's direction and future after the untimely death of founder Stephen Marriott.

WCPX holds a construction permit to build digital facilities on channel 25. WCPX had an application to flash cut to digital on channel 48 that was dismissed when WSYX received authorization to move to channel 48.

WCPX has also signed up for an affiliation with Mexicanal, a Spanish-language television channel for Mexican-Americans; the station's plans for the channel have yet to be announced. Mexicanal is also seen on WCSN-LD since March 15, 2011.

On March 1, 2011, Azteca América disaffiliated with WCPX-LP, moving its programming to WQMC-LD2.

References

External links
Columbus Dispatch article on the station's launch

CPX-LD
Television channels and stations established in 1985
1985 establishments in Ohio
Low-power television stations in the United States
SagamoreHill Broadcasting